Malang is a 2020 Indian Hindi-language action thriller film directed by Mohit Suri and produced by T-Series in collaboration with Luv Films and Northern Lights Entertainment with distribution by Yash Raj Films. The film stars Anil Kapoor, Aditya Roy Kapur, Disha Patani and Kunal Khemu.

The shooting began in March 2019 and took place primarily in Goa, but it was also filmed in Mauritius. Final schedule was wrapped up in October 2019. The female lead role went to Patani after Shraddha Kapoor's refusal.

Initially announced as a Valentine's Day 2020 release, Malang was preponed by 1 week to avoid clash with the much-hyped Kartik Aaryan-Sara Ali Khan-starrer Love Aaj Kal. It was finally released worldwide in cinemas on 7 February 2020. It was praised for its music, action sequences, direction and cast performances, Malang has earned  worldwide thus becoming a commercial success.

Plot

A young man is released from jail after five years as he ends his sentence with a brutal fight, finishing off a fellow convict. Inspector Anjaney Agashe is a rugged drug-addicted cop who gets rid of known criminals by killing them and staging their deaths like a police encounter. His daughter had been shot during a raid in Goa. Upon release, the young man immediately calls Agashe and informs him of an upcoming murder of a police officer and wishes him "Happy Solstice." Agashe's friend and colleague, Michael Rodrigues, is a cop who plays by the rules; his personal life is breaking down, as his wife, Teresa, is having an affair with another man.

Later on, Michael learns that his friend and co-worker, Victor, has been brutally murdered. At the crime scene, Michael meets Agashe, and the two are instantly at odds with each other: Agashe wants to kill the murderer, while Michael wants the murderer to be imprisoned. It is implied that the young man committed the murder, and slowly, his connections to both Agashe and Michael are revealed.

Five years ago, the man, now revealed to be Advait Thakur, then a cheerful, happy-go-lucky guy, meets Sara Nambiar at a rave party in Goa. The two fall in love and decide to travel and party together as vagrants. One day, Sara finds out that she is pregnant with Advait's child. The two initially decide to mutually abort the child. At another rave party, Sara watches a young girl named Vaani talking on the phone to her father, later revealed to be Agashe, who then gatecrashes the same party to capture drug dealers there. Crossfire ensues, and Vaani gets shot by Agashe's bullet, dying in her father's arms. Sara witnesses this, seeing Agashe break down at his daughter's death, and changes her mind. Vaani's death leads to Agashe's alcohol and drug addiction and his change in personality. Sara tells Advait of her decision and that she no longer wants a nomadic life. Advait, having a fear of commitment, leaves Sara and goes off towards the northern mountains to meet a friend.

In the present day, Advait murders two more cops, Nitin and Deven, both of whom were Michael's colleagues. Michael becomes suspicious of Jessie, a drug-addicted prostitute who is Advait's friend and has been helping him with the murders. Michael noticed her in the room and followed her to her presiding place, and on knowing this, Jessie tries to burn down the evidence at her place, but Michael enters and sees that he is also one of the targets on Advait's hit list. In a turn of events, after killing the three officers in Michael's team, Advait surrenders himself to Agashe. Michael's past and what really happened to Sara and Advait is revealed: Michael grew up in an abusive family. As an adult, he is about to marry his girlfriend Teresa, but due to the childhood abuse, he is uncomfortable with sex and intimacy and rejects Teresa when she touches him before marriage, giving the excuse that he doesn't want such relations before the wedding. However, fearing that his lack of sexual experience will make him "less than a man," Michael goes to Jessie to lose his virginity. Sara has been living with Jessie after Advait left her. Michael enters while Jessie was away at the market and mistakes Sara for Jessie. In the meantime, Advait returns to Goa, having realized his mistake. He arrives at Jessie's house, only to find Michael trying to strangle Sara. He intervenes and calls the police. Nitin, Deven, and Victor arrive. In the police van, Advait and Sara reconcile. Instead of the station, the police take Advait and Sara to a bridge, where they plan to frame them for drug peddling to avoid Michael's scandal, who showed up there as a cop visiting a prostitute. Michael injects a lethal drug into the couple before throwing Sara off the bridge, while Advait is sentenced to five years in jail. Advait has been taking revenge for Sara's death.

In the present day, Michael reveals to Advait at the station that he strangled Jessie after the house burnt. He then leaves so that Agashe can do his "encounter." However, before leaving, Michael says "Happy Solstice" to Agashe that makes Agashe realize that he is the reason behind Advait's vengeance as Advait had been calling Agashe before each murder and saying the same thing. Agashe takes Advait to the same bridge where it all started, where Advait tells him that Michael and his friends killed Sara. At the same time, Michael goes home and sees that Teresa is about to leave him. Michael suffers a psychotic breakdown and attempts to murder her. As he is choking her, he is suddenly injected in the neck with a drug. When he turns around, he sees Sara, alive and well, wearing the same jacket as Advait was wearing.

It is shown in a flashback that Jessie had saved Sara from the fall, but she lost her baby. Over the course of five years, Sara and Advait had been planning revenge together, and it is also shown that the murders were committed by both Sara and Advait together. Suddenly, Agashe's assistant receives a call informing him that Michael has been murdered in his own home. Advait laughs as a shocked Agashe wonders who killed Michael. He reluctantly releases Advait due to lack of evidence, and Teresa tells the police she saw a man, thus protecting Sara. Advait and Sara find peace and start a new life.

The film ends with Agashe getting a phone call from an unknown female caller, informing him about an upcoming murder just like he was informed by Advait.

Cast 
 Anil Kapoor as Inspector Anjaney Agashe
 Aditya Roy Kapur as Advait Thakur
 Disha Patani as Sara Nambiar
 Kunal Khemu as Michael Rodrigues
 Elli AvrRam as Jessabelle a.k.a. Jessie
 Keith Sequeira as Nitin Salgaonkar
 Amruta Khanvilkar as Teresa Rodrigues
 Vatsal Sheth as Victor Ferns
 Makarand Deshpande as Tony
 Prasad Jawade as Deven Shivaji Jadhav
 Sanjeev Dhuri as Borkar
 Siddhant Ghegadmal as Mady
 Devika Vatsa as Vaani Agashe
 Vansh sayani as Nitin Salgaonkar's son
 Shaad Randhawa (special appearance) as Advait's friend
 Shraddha Kapoor (voice cameo) as an unknown caller

Production

Initially, the film was offered to Shraddha Kapoor who could not fit the film into her busy schedule but agreed to do voiceover in the climax. 

The filming began on 16 March 2019. The principal photography began on 22 March in Goa. The Mauritius schedule was shot in the first week of May. The film was wrapped up on 7 October 2019.

Release
The film was initially scheduled to be released on 14 February 2020; later on 26 December 2019, it was moved earlier by a week to 7 February 2020. The movie was made available in Netflix on 15 May.

Reception

Malang received mixed reviews from critics. Harshada Rege of The Times of India gave the film 3.5 out of 5 stars stating, "In this film, none of the characters are uni-dimensional, which makes them interesting. Malang begins well with a power-packed action scene, and dives straight into the drama." Madhuri V of Filmibeat also gave it 3.5 stars out of 5 and said, "After the lacklustre Half Girlfriend, Mohit Suri returns to his favourite genre- thrillers, and we must say, the man pulls it off quite well when it comes to calling the shots." According to Bollywood Hungama, which also gave the film 3.5 stars out of 5, quoting that the Disha Patani-Aditya Roy Kapur-starrer Malang is high on style with good performances and thrilling moments but has an average storyline. Apart from positive reviews, the film also received some average critical reviews. Rajeev Masand of News18 India stated in his review, "the plot of the film was unconvincing and doesn't justify the indulgence. Shubhra Gupta of The Indian Express wrote "Malang is a tepid thriller and its twists don't really take you aback". Rawal Kukreja of Hindustan Times stated that the story was predictable with a whittled away second half and a limping plot.

Soundtrack 

The film's music was composed by with Mithoon, Ankit Tiwari, Ved Sharma, The Fusion Project, Adnan Dhool and Rabi Ahmed with lyrics written by Sayeed Quadri, Kunaal Vermaa, Prince Dubey, Haarsh Limbachiyaa and Adnan Dhool (for "Ho Ja Mast Malang Tu", a version of his band Soch's earlier single "Bol Hu" - released by Nescafé Basement).

Home media 
The film was made available to stream on OTT platform Netflix on 15 May 2020.

Box office
Malang earned 6.71 crore net at the domestic box office on its opening day. On the second day, the film collected ₹8.89 crore net and 9.76 crores on its third day, taking the total opening weekend collection to ₹25.36 crores.

, with a gross of 70.23 crore in India and 14.27 crore overseas, the film has a worldwide gross collection of 84.50 crore.

Sequel 
A sequel, Malang 2, was officially announced on 31 May 2020. Starring Shraddha Kapoor, Sidharth Malhotra and Anil Kapoor.

References

External links
 
 

2020 films
2020 action thriller films
2020s romantic thriller films
Indian action thriller films
Indian romantic thriller films
2020s Hindi-language films
T-Series (company) films
Indian films about revenge
Indian romantic action films
2020s masala films
Films distributed by Yash Raj Films
2020s romantic action films